Rachael Margot Smith (known professionally as Rachael Margot, born 1985) is a Perth born presenter and model.

Biography
Rachael grew up in Perth, Western Australia, as the youngest of three children. She trained as a classical ballet dancer and then as a rhythmic gymnast.

Rachael's love for the environment led her to complete an Environmental Science degree, and her devotion to helping the environment has been furthered by her Miss Earth Australia title.

Rachael moved from Perth to Sydney in 2009 and studied screen acting at the National Institute of Dramatic Art (NIDA) in Sydney, Australia.

Miss Earth Pageant
Rachael was crowned Miss Earth Australia 2008 and represented Australia in the Miss Earth 2008 International Pageant in the Philippines. Rachael won Miss Talent at the international event for her graceful and dynamic rhythmic gymnastics display.

References

External links
 Official Site of Rachael Margot
 Miss Earth International Official Site
 Miss Earth Australia Official Site
 Miss Earth 2008 - Wikipedia Article
 Sydney Morning Herald
 Toronto Sun
 www.suleka.com - India
 The Brisbane Times
 
 Pageants India
 Jamaicans.com

1985 births
Australian beauty pageant winners
Living people
Miss Earth 2008 contestants
People from Perth, Western Australia